Empress Dương may refer to:

Dương Vân Nga (died 1000), empress dowager of the Đinh Dynasty and empress consort of the Early Lê dynasty
Empress Mother Thượng Dương (died 1073), Lý Thánh Tông's empress
Dương Thị Thục (1868–1944), empress dowager of the Nguyễn dynasty

Dương